Barsabbas or Barsabas is a surname used in the Acts of the Apostles, to refer to two persons:

Joseph called Barsabbas, who was surnamed Justus. He was a candidate to fill the vacancy among the Twelve Apostles. 
Judas Barsabbas, an emissary of the Church of Jerusalem to the Church at Antioch. 

The name denotes either
a literal son of a man called Sabbas
a symbolic name, meaning son of sabbath or rest, or of return

See also
Barshabba
Barsabias